The Write Stuff, "Radio 4's game of literary correctness", was a lighthearted quiz about literature on BBC Radio 4, taking a humorous look at famous literary figures, which ran from 1998 to 2014. It was chaired and written by James Walton. The two teams were captained by novelist Sebastian Faulks and journalist John Walsh, with Beth Chalmers reading literary extracts.

Format
John Walsh and Sebastian Faulks have been team captains since the programme began. They are each joined by another journalist or novelist; frequent guests in later years included John O'Farrell, Mark Billingham and Lynn Truss. Truss stepped in as captain to replace Faulks for series 13 (2010).

Each week, the programme has an "Author of the Week"; W. B. Yeats, E. M. Forster, D. H. Lawrence, Robert Burns, and J. K. Rowling all featured in the programme. The programme has, on occasion, featured a group of writers, rather than a single author, as its key study - for example, poets of the Beat Generation were the featured authors on 26 October 2010. Each programme begins with the panellists reading favourite extracts from the author's writing, and the first round is a series of questions about the author's life and works.

The programme normally ends with panellists having to write a pastiche (or parody; the programme uses the terms interchangeably) based on that week's author of the week. Walton describes these as 'the most popular bit of the programme'. Walton sets a topic that would be so out of style of the author in question that a pastiche would be humorous. For example, when Robert Burns was the author of the week, contestants were asked to write a poem, in the style of Burns, celebrating something typically English; when Philip Roth was the author of the week, contestants were asked how he might have written a children's story. Faulks has published a collection of his parodies as a book, Pistache.

The intervening rounds do not focus on the author of the week. Rounds commonly included are: connections; odd one out; literary mistakes; the archive round; and a music round.

The programme has normally been broadcast at 18:30 on a weekday, one of the Radio 4 comedy slots.

Episodes

Series 1 (1998)

Series 2 (1999)

Series 3 (2000)

Series 4 (2001)

Series 5 (2002)

Christmas Special (2002)

Series 6 (2003)

Series 7 (2004)

Christmas Special (2004)

Series 8 (2005)

Series 9 (2006)

Series 10 (2007)

Series 11 (2008)

Series 12 (2008)

Series 13 (2010)

Series 14 (2010)

Cheltenham Literature Festival Special

Series 15 (2012)

Series 16 (2013)

Series 17 (2014)

References

External links
 
 

BBC Radio 4 programmes
British radio game shows
1990s British game shows
2000s British game shows
2010s British game shows